Grant was launched at Whitby in 1798, or possibly 1799. She made one voyage for the British East India Company (EIC) between 1800 and 1802. Thereafter she sailed as a West Indiaman or a London-based transport. She was last heard from in 1820; Spanish authorities may have seized her off Peru.

Career
Grant first appears in Lloyd's Register in 1800 with Peacock, master, Rucker & Co. owner, and trade London–St Vincent. The Register of Shipping for 1800 has Peacock as master, but G. Faith owner, and trade Whitby–Shields, changing to London–St Vincent.

Messrs. Princip and Saunders tendered her to the EIC to bring back rice from Bengal. She was one of 28 vessels that sailed between November 1800 and February 1801. On 28 November Grant, Captain Peacock, sailed from England, bound for Bengal. She was off the English coast on 16 December. She arrived at Calcutta on 30 April 1801. 

 

Homeward bound, she left Bengal on 25 July and by 18 January 1802 was off Dungeness. She returned to her moorings on 24 January.

The voyage to India appears in Lloyd's Register for 1801, but not in the Register of Shipping for 1801. One source states that Grant was used extensively as a convict transport. If so, it is not clear where she transported the convicts from or too as she does not appear in the listings of vessels that transported convicts to Australia.

Fate 
Grants fate is obscure as there are reports that are inconsistent.

On 14 August 1821 Lloyd's list reported that Grant had departed from Gibraltar for San Blas on 30 July 1820, and that there was no further trace of her. The report mentioned that there had been no confirmation of the prior report. Lastly, a letter from Lima dated 17 April 1821 reported that Grant, of London, had been off Pisco, Peru, five months earlier, i.e., in November 1820.

Grant was last listed in the Register of Shipping in 1821. She was last listed in Lloyd's Register in 1825, but with information unchanged since 1821.

Citations

References
 
 
  

1790s ships
1820s missing person cases
Ships built in Whitby
Age of Sail merchant ships of England
Ships of the British East India Company
Captured ships
Missing ships
Maritime incidents in July 1820